Xfinity 3D was a 3DTV channel owned by Comcast and available exclusively on their Xfinity digital cable television service. It launched on February 20, 2011.

Comcast made the decision to discontinue the channel as of December 16, 2014.

Programming

The first program to air was the 2011 Heritage Classic game between the Montreal Canadiens and the Calgary Flames. It was followed by MTV World Stage: Kings of Leon. The channel also carried movies documenting African safaris, haunted castles, the depths of the ocean, the surface of the sun, the age of dinosaurs and more, along with original programming about Chinese dragon dancing and rhythmic gymnastics.

Xfinity 3D also had an on-demand channel sponsored by HBO. Xfinity 3D On Demand provided customers access to movies such as Ice Age: Dawn of the Dinosaurs, Monsters vs. Aliens and Coraline. Other 3D titles that were available through the VOD service included Bolt, Clash of the Titans, Despicable Me, Chicken Little and The Last Airbender.

References

3D television channels
Comcast subsidiaries
Television channels and stations established in 2011
2011 establishments in the United States